Iron Man has a large range of villains. They each have specific abilities which they use against Tony Stark. While these enemies include major independent operators such as Mandarin and Doctor Doom, many of the more minor foes, especially those equipped with extremely advanced weaponry, are mercenaries of Justin Hammer. This is a list of them in alphabetical order:

A
 Absynthe - In her digitalized form, Absynthe is a computer virus capable of infiltrating Tony's Stark armor.
 Actor - A man who could impersonate anyone he saw.
 Advanced Idea Mechanics (A.I.M.) - An organization of scientists dedicated to the acquisition of power and the overthrow of all governments through a technological revolution. The group is often led by the conniving man-mind MODOK.
 Arsenal - A doomsday robot built by Iron Man's father, Howard Stark.
 Arno Stark - Arno is the brother of Tony Stark and birth son of Howard and Maria Stark. He wore the Iron Man 2020 armor.
 Artax - A man who worked for Stark Industries, but then was fired when he built an energy hand cannon which he used to try and defeat Iron Man. 
 Atom Smasher - Generated atomic radiation, which he could project as heat, concussive force, or hard radiation.
 Aldrich Killian - A scientist who developed the Extremis virus along with Maya Hansen.

B
 Beetle - A master mechanic who wears a beetle-themed armor. His real name is Abner Jenkins.
 Blizzard - A costumed villain with a suit that enables him to produce ice and cold and a former Stark employee who was fired for robbery. Originally known as Jack Frost.
 Black Knight - Wears black, medieval-looking armor.
 Black Lama - An extra-dimensional mystic who tried to incite a war amongst the supervillains.
 Blacklash - A costumed criminal who uses an energized whip. He was originally known as Whiplash (see below) and later re-assumed his original alias.
 Blood Brothers - Each Blood Brother's tremendous strength and durability is dependent on his proximity to his twin. When standing together, the two have a high degree of superhuman strength, but if separated by a great distance, they weaken to below even normal human levels. The Brothers also drain the blood of other beings in the manner of a vampire, although it is unclear as to whether they totally rely on blood for sustenance. They have been previously controlled by Thanos and the Controller.
 Boomerang - A costumed villain who uses a series of gimmicked boomerangs as his signature weapons.
 Brothers Grimm -  Possess the ability to conjure, with the appearance of sleight of hand, a variety of small novelty items from within their costumes.

C
 Cassandra Gillespie - Cassandra Gillespie is an international arms dealer and was a childhood love interest of Tony Stark when he was studying at the University of Cambridge. 
 Cerebrus - Super-computer from the future which Stark allegedly created.
 Cerberus - Three-headed watchdog of Pluto's underworld.
 Chemistro - Able to transmute any substance into any other form of matter.
 Chet - Chet (aka. Go-Killa) is a hyper-intelligent gorilla.
 Circle - A brotherhood based on Arthurian ideals, led by Arthur.
 Chessmen - Chess-themed henchmen of Obadiah Stane.
 Coldblood - Lieutenant Colonel going by the real name of Eric Savin. Resurrected as a cyborg after having cyberbenetic surgery.
 Controller - A domination-hungry scientist with the power to control minds.
 Count Nefaria - Leader of the crime cartel the Maggia.
 Crimson Cowl - The daughter of Justin Hammer, later used the identity to lead a version of the Masters of Evil and bedevil the Thunderbolts.
 Crimson Dynamo - A Soviet super soldier clad in powered red armor.

D
 Demolisher - A robot developed by Drexel Cord to defeat Iron Man.
 Detroit Steel - Usually an adversary or rival to Iron Man. Principal characters in storylines that have worn the armor include Lt. Doug Johnson and Sasha Hammer. Individual soldiers wearing the Detroit Steel armor have been called Steelmechs or Hammermechs.
 Diablo - A practitioner of alchemy, science based upon the transmutation of elements, and has attained mastery of the alchemical sciences with his genius-level intellect.
 Doctor Demonicus - A genius with a Ph.D. in genetics, he has an advanced knowledge of genetics and of the advanced technology of the alien Myndai.
 Doctor Doom - Has a similar relationship with/vendetta against Iron Man/Tony Stark as he does with Mister Fantastic/Reed Richards, who is one of Stark's best friends.
 Doctor Spectrum - Ability to project and manipulate light energy in various colors, create light energy constructs of various shapes, sizes and colors.
 Dreadknight - A disfigured scientist in knight armor with a vendetta against Iron Man and Doctor Doom.
 Dreadnought - A non-sentient robotic combat instrument originally created by the subversive organization HYDRA for use in various commando operations.

E
 Earth-Mover - A combination of Dr. Maximilian Stone and a magma entity.
 Edwin Cord - CEO of Cordco. Responsible for the funding of the Raiders and the creation of Firepower.
 Eli Warren - A mentor of Tony Stark. Leader of the Modernist Army. He was injected with the Extremis serum.
 Endotherm - A Stark employee who becomes paranoid at the thought of losing his job.
 Ezekiel Stane - A businessman, son of the Iron Monger, a.k.a. Obadiah Stane.

F
 Feilong - A mutant hating, genius industrialist whose goal was to conquer Mars. 
 Fin Fang Foom - Alien dragon from the planet Maklu IV.
 Firebrand - A fire-themed supervillain in a suit that not only has flamethrowers mounted on the wrist, it is also fire resistant.
 Firepower - A suited villain worn by Jack Taggert who initially defeated Iron Man in the Armor Wars storyline.
 Fixer - An intuitive genius at invention of weapons and other electrical and mechanical devices.
 Flying Tiger - Wears body armor under a tiger costume and is capable of powered flight.
 Force - Uses a powered battle-suit incorporating the force field projector.
 Frankenstein's Monster - Built from human corpses by a scientist named Victor Frankenstein, in Ingolstadt, Bavaria, in the late 18th century.
 Freak - Can absorb large doses of cobalt radiation without harming himself and also discharge cobalt blasts from his hands.
 Freak Quincy - An apparent mutant who can broad on every wavelength of the EM spectrum which enabled him to shut down Iron Man's systems.
 Frostbite - Dr. Sloan Alden ran a cryogenics institute, where the wealthy and dying would be frozen. As a result of the Zodiac draining all the energy out of New York, Alden’s own cryo-chamber drained power from the others, as well as a back-up generator, to keep him alive. The side-effect granted him the ability to generate and control ice, as well as creating things like ice walls and ice storms.

G
 Gargantus - An outer space robot who appeared in the form of a giant Neanderthal man, as the aliens had last visited Earth 80,000 years ago. It hypnotized the people of Granville before being destroyed by Iron Man.
 Ghost - A professional saboteur with equipment that allows him to become intangible who is determined to kill Tony Stark and destroy Stark Enterprises.
 Gladiator - Costume designer that seeks to defeat costumed superheroes.
 Godzilla - Initially, Iron Man, along with the other Avengers, encountered Godzilla when the giant monster rampaged through New York. Later, while under the mental control of Doctor Demonicus, a mutated, more amphibious Godzilla attacked Iron Man, only to be later freed from Demonicus' control by him.
 Grey Gargoyle - A costumed villain who can turn anything he touches into stone. 
 Griffin - A New Orleans punk turned into a monster by the Secret Empire.
 Growing Man - A form of android that absorbs any kinetic energy directed against it.
 Guardsman - Wears powered armor designed by Tony Stark and Stark Industries.

H
 Half-Face - Vietnamese scientist commissioned by his Communist rulers to develop a new explosive for use in the war.
 Hypnomind - A villain with the ability of mind controlling and uses the controlled as his personal soldiers.
 Hypnotia - A costumed villain with mind controlling abilities. First seen on the Iron Man TV series.
 HYDRA - Despite the name's capitalization per Marvel's official spelling, the name is not an acronym but rather a reference to the mythical Lernaean Hydra.

I
 Immortus - A master of time itself and future version of Kang the Conqueror, Immortus was responsible for manipulating Iron Man into various acts of villainy (including murder) against the Avengers during the controversial storyline "The Crossing".
 Inferno - She possessed the ability to fly and generate intense heat and flames, generally focused into powerful bolts of energy, strong enough to vaporize steel.
 Iron Man 2093 - A psychotic madman who utilizes his grandfather Arno Stark's armor.
 Iron Monger - Obadiah Stane (father of Ezekiel Stane), the business executive who stole Stark Enterprises from Tony Stark. He also found the mask of the first suit that Tony created while being held hostage and perfected it to become the first Iron Monger.

J
 Justin Hammer - Has access to various forms of advanced technology designed by his technicians.

K
 Kala - The queen of the underground city known as the Netherworld. She tried to take over the surface world, but once she was taken there, she aged rapidly and called off her attack.
 Kang the Conqueror - An extraordinary genius, an expert historical scholar, and a master physicist (specializing in time travel), engineer, and technician.
 Kearson DeWitt - Controlled a massive suit of armor and was behind the attempt to seize control of Stark's body during "Armor Wars II."
 Killer Shrike - A gravity-manipulating agent of Roxxon Oil.
 Kraken - A master manipulator and a founding father of HYDRA. He specialized in helping people become who they were supposed to be.
 Krang - Has all the powers inherent to members of the Atlantean race, including superhuman strength
 Korvac- Michael Korvac was born originally half man, half sophisticated computer in the 31st century. Attaining godly power from the Worldship of Galactus, he then traveled back in time threatening the entire universe. He was reborn by the creation of the Enclave.

L
 Living Laser - A laser expert who eventually evolved into a being made of pure light energy.
 Lucifer - Has a gifted intellect, and extensive knowledge of advanced Quistalian science and technology, and talent as an inventor using this technology.

M
 Mad Pharaoh - King Hatap, an Ancient Egyptian ruler whose knowledge of magic and dreadful acts earned him the nickname 'The Mad Pharaoh fought against Cleopatra, but after failing, went into suspended animation by drinking a potion which the Egyptians thought had killed him. After being reawakened in modern times, he travels to the past with Stark using his Chariot of Time, hoping his scientific technology might help him, planning to defeat Cleopatra, but after his army is defeated by Iron Man, he trips onto an upturned sword and is killed. Stark then uses the Chariot of Time to return to the 20th century, despite the beauty of Cleopatra.
 Maggia - An international crime syndicate that is the world's most powerful organization dedicated to conventional crime.
 Magma - Wears body armor and has a blast gun implanted in his right arm that was able to fire balls of lava.
 Madame Masque - The daughter of Count Nefaria; she hides her scarred face behind a golden mask. She often has conflicted loyalties between her father and her lover, Iron Man.
 Mallen - A terrorist who gained the Extremis virus.
 Man-Bull - A villain who was turned into a humanoid bull-monster through experiments.
 Mandroids - Power armors that provided the wearer with extensive offensive options so they could respond to various threats.
 Man-Killer - Has robotic implants, which gave her superhuman powers, good athletic abilities, and the ability to throw knives at a range of hundreds of meters.
 Mandarin - The archenemy of Iron Man, the Mandarin is a Chinese nobleman, scientist and former diplomat turned criminal mastermind. His true power comes from his superhuman mastery of the martial arts and 10 rings of power he recovered from an alien spaceship along with highly advanced technology, which he tried to use for the conquest of Earth.
 Mauler - A Scottish mercenary hired by A.I.M. to lead an attack on the S.H.I.E.L.D. Helicarrier. He wears an armored suit with deadly weaponry attached, including a rapid fire laser machine gun.
 Marauder - A mercenary for hire, he has duel weaponized sabers that come out of his wrists. He also has a built in flame thrower and many other weapons in his arsenal.
 Masters of Silence - A group of high-tech assassins that honor the samurai code and are hired to eliminate Tony Stark.
 Melter - A former business competitor with a beam that can melt iron.
 Mercenary - An assassin for hire who has been trained to murder since childhood.
 Midas - Dresses in the clothing of ancient Greece, and supports his enormous weight by wearing a powered exoskeleton.
 Mikas - An android construct used by 'Mr. Kline', himself an android sent from the distant future by a super-computer to avert that very future from ever occurring.
 Minotaur - The son of a scientist whose cure for an unspecific disease mutated him into an actual Minotaur.
 MODOK - A mutagenically altered technician of A.I.M. with superior intelligence (his name is an acronym for Mental Organism Designed Only for Killing).
 Mr. Doll - A hooded man that uses a magical transforming doll (similar to a voodoo doll) which he stole from an African wise-man to attack Iron Man after he causes pain to millionaires to try to make them sign over their fortunes, and Tony Stark becomes his next target. His first appearance was in Tales of Suspense #48. He caused Tony to create a newer, slimmer suit. He is defeated when Iron Man uses a device to remodel the doll to Mr. Doll's semblance, meaning when he drops it, he is knocked unconscious.

N
 Night Phantom - Travis Scott is a writer who was a paralyzed after a plane crash. He has hated technology ever since and wears bandages as a side effect of diving into a radioactive pool that cured his paralysis. The same radioactive pool gave him super-strength and enhanced durability.
 Nitro - Can transform his body into a gaseous state and explode.
 Norman Osborn - He is the archenemy of Spider-Man. Like Stark, he has access to various forms of advanced technology. He is perhaps best known for being the original Green Goblin.

O
 Obadiah Stane - A businessman and a rival of Tony Stark, at one point he took over Stark Enterprises after Tony Stark succumbed to alcoholism.
 Omega Red - A serial killer who underwent experiments in a Soviet version of the Weapon X program, which equipped him with retractable tentacle-like coils in each of his arms.

R
 Radioactive Man - A Chinese physicist who can manipulate radiation.
 Raiders - A trio of supercriminals in powered armor suits.

S
 Sadurang - Sadurang was an Asgardian Dragon and a powerful sorcerer. He studied under Dormammu, and prided himself in being allegedly his favored student. Fueled by greed, Sadurang hoarded many riches, including powerful artifacts like the First Eye of Agamotto.
 Sasha Hammer - Daughter to Justine Hammer and the Mandarin, and granddaughter to Justin Hammer. After Zeke Stane upgraded her like him, Sasha possesses superhuman abilities, such as energy whips from her fingerprints. She wore the Detroit Steel armor.
 Samurai Steel - He was born in Japan and disliked Americans. He made a battle suit to slay Tony Stark.
 Satellite Killer - Impervious not only to the vacuum of space but to many forms of attack as well - and not only that, it is quite equipped to do its genetically-programmed job. It has razor-sharp claws and teeth are in abundance all over its body.
 Scarecrow - Ebenezer Laughton, a contortionist performing as the Uncanny Umberto, initially helped Iron Man stop a criminal that had fled into one of his shows. Ebenezer was later approached by operatives of the Mandarin who encouraged him to start a new life of crime and industrial espionage using his contortion abilities and a flock of trained crows.
 Shatterax - The cold and calculating hunter, cybernetically enhanced Kree warrior was a onetime member to the empires Starforce.
 Shockwave - A former MI-6 agent, who stole an exo-suit.
 Slag - Dr. Ted Slaght is a scientist and former teacher of Tony Stark that works for Stark Enterprises. A terrible accident transforms him into a liquid metallic form called Slag and he wants revenge on Tony Stark for "betraying" him.
 Spymaster - A mercenary and spy-for-hire.
 Stilt-Man - A armored thief who wears a pair of hydraulic stilts.
 Stockpile - A group of mercenaries hired by Morgan Stark.
 Stratosfire - Former Roxxon corporate "hero" and opponent of Iron Man. She wore a newer version of Sunturion's armor.
 Super-Adaptoid - Created by A.I.M, the first Super-Adaptoid is an artificial construct capable of copying or mimicking the powers and skills of numerous super beings, including specific equipment and clothing.
 Sunfire - A mutant with the ability to absorb solar radiation, and convert it to ionize matter into a fiery plasma state which bursts into flame when exposed to oxygen.
 Sunset Bain - Is a genius in the field of cybernetics and the CEO of Baintronics, Inc. As Madam Meance she sold high-tech weaponry to criminals throughout the underground. She's a former love interest and business rival to Tony. Her human body was destroyed so she became AI.
 Sunturion - A normal human who undergoes a mutagenic modification process that converts him into microwave energy.
 Switchback - A group of mercenaries hired by Morgan Stark.

T
 Taskmaster - A mercenary with photographic reflexes.
 Technovore - An organism which was the result of Cauwfield Chemical Co. clandestinely using nanotechnology on Stark's space station.
 Temugin - The son of the Mandarin.
 Thanos - The Mad Titan.
 Thundersword - Stewart Cadwall, a television writer empowered by the Beyonder. He is considered a parody of script writer Steve Gerber.
 Tiberius Stone - As children, Tiberius Stone and Tony Stark were friends. However, Howard Stark drove his unnamed father's company Viastone to bankruptcy. As an adult, Stone published false news stories to ruin Stark's reputation. He faked his kidnapping and created a prison made for Stark. However, Stark captured him and imprisoned him in the prison. He later went on to help form Alchemax, where his son in the 2099 reality is Tyler Stone.
 Titanium Man - A Soviet super soldier clad in powered armor. Mentor to the Unicorn, who knew him as "the Other".
 Tomoe - Operating as the Techno Golem, Tomoe is an Inhuman crime lord in Japan with the ability to control technology with nothing but her thoughts.

U
 Udarnik - A Soviet robot that was stranded on the Moon since 1972. Udarnik possesses two personalities: Udarnik is programmed to build, while Shockworker is used in defense and attack.
 Unicorn - A Soviet supersoldier who was healed and mentored by the Titanium Man. His suit is equipped with a cone-shaped blaster on his head.
 Ultimo - A doomsday robot built by an unknown alien race and activated by the Mandarin.
 Ultron - An android built by fellow Avenger Hank Pym which is responsible for Stark's Sentient Armor going rogue and has had an invasion of Tony Stark's body that transformed him into a robotic duplicate of Janet van Dyne. In the film Avengers: Age of Ultron, Stark is responsible for Ultron's creation.

V
 Vibro - He gained superhuman powers when his nuclear-powered seismic energy absorption apparatus was grafted to his body; this apparatus has been transformed into a vibrational energy generator.
 VOR/TEX - A sentient computer and enemy to Iron Man.

W
 Whirlwind - A costumed villain who can create strong whirlwinds by spinning.
 White Dragon - The first White Dragon was a talented inventor and scientist with a genius-level intellect. The second White Dragon is an expert martial artist.
 Whiplash - A weapons expert who brandishes a specially designed whip as his personal weapon (also see Blacklash above).
 Wong-Chu - A Chinese Communist leader and expert martial artist who held Tony Stark captive and tried to force him to make weapons for his guerrilla forces. Tony instead created the first Iron Man suit and defeated Wong-Chu.

See also
 List of Iron Man supporting characters
 List of Iron Man titles
 List of Captain America enemies

References

External links
 Iron Man Armor - The Bad Guys Page
 Ten Deep 5.06.10: The Top Ten Iron Man Villains
 Top Iron Man Villains | Iron Man World | UGO.com

Enemies
 
Lists of Marvel Comics supervillains
Lists of Marvel Comics characters
Comics characters by protagonist